Aloy Adlawan (also credited as Alfred Aloysius L. Adlawan), a chemical engineer by profession, is a multi-awarded Filipino filmmaker- writer, producer, director, composer. He attended filmmaking courses at the Mowelfund Film Institute in the Philippines and the New York Film Academy in New York City.

His award-winning works include the screenplays “Ang Babae sa Burol” (2nd place, Don Carlos Palanca Memorial Awards for Literature, 1994), “Ang Mga Ibon sa Dapithapon” (1st place, Film Development Foundation Scriptwriting Contest, 1995), and “Padyak”  (3rd  place, Don Carlos Palanca Memorial Awards for Literature, 2008); the short film “Si Lolo Tasyo at ang Araw” (3rd place, Gawad CCP for Alternative Film and Video, 1997), among others.

In 2005, he is among the finalists of the first Cinemalaya Independent Film Festival with his film Room Boy (as writer, producer, director) where Meryll Soriano won Best Actress. His horror film Ouija (writer) is 2007’s biggest horror blockbuster, is awarded PinakaPasadong Dulang Pampeplikula at the 10th Pasado Gawad Sining Sine by the Pampelikulang Samahan ng mga Dalubguro and was nominated for Best Screenplay in various award-giving bodies. His film Signos (writer, producer, director) was awarded the Best Foreign Film at the 2007 Lone Star International Film Festival in Fort Worth, Texas, was given an Award of Excellence at the 2007 Accolade Film Competition in California, received the Bronze Foreign Film Award at The International Filmmaker Festival in U.K, and won Best International Thriller at the 2008 New York International Independent Film and Video Festival.

He recently won a National Commission on Culture and the Arts grant to his film Padyak under his own company Breaking.The.Box Productions.

Filmography

Television 
 2014 Third Eye (as director)
 2009 All My Life (as head writer)
 2009 Paano Ba Ang Mangarap? (as head writer)
 2008 Magdusa Ka (as head writer)
 2008 Maging Akin Ka Lamang (as writer)
 2007 Boys Nxt Door (as creator and writer)
 2006 Star Magic Presents (as writer, for episode Windows to the Heart
 2006 Komiks (as writer, for episode Bampy)

Film 
 2016 Imagine You and Me (co-writer)
 2011 My Valentine Girls (as screenplay)
 2010 Dagaw (as screenplay)
 2009 T2 (as screenplay)
 2009 Sundo (as screenplay)
 2009 Padyak (as screenplay and director)
 2009 When I Met U (as screenplay)
 2008 Condo (as screenplay and executive producer)
 2007 3 Days of Darkness (as screenplay)
 2007 Ouija (as screenplay)
 2007 Signos (as screenplay, producer and director)
 2005 Shake, Rattle and Roll 2k5 (as screenplay)
 2005 Room Boy (as screenplay, producer and director)
 2005 Happily Ever After (as screenplay)

References

 https://web.archive.org/web/20120401204738/http://showbizandstyle.inquirer.net/entertainment/entertainment/view/20070810-81779/Alfred_Aloysius_Adlawan_likes_exploring_the_criminal_mind
 https://web.archive.org/web/20090316002114/http://globalnation.inquirer.net/features/features/view/20090311-193560/Aloy-Adlawan-enjoys-the-best-of-both-worlds
 http://www.articlearchives.com/humanities-social-science/visual-performing-arts-visual/513957-1.html
 https://web.archive.org/web/20110607053018/http://www.newsflash.org/2004/02/sb/sb005049.htm "Signos Review"
 http://www.gmanews.tv/story/68533/Signos-honored-as-Best-Foreign-Film-in-Texas
 http://guides.clickthecity.com/movies/?p=4591 "Padyak"
 http://www.pep.ph/guide/3492/PEP-REVIEW:-Padyak-ponders-on-the-meaning-of-life/1

External links
 

Filipino dramatists and playwrights
Living people
Filipino screenwriters
GMA Network (company) people
Year of birth missing (living people)